Edward Kenworthy Hornby (16 June 1839, in Blackburn – 25 June 1887) was an English Conservative Party politician. He sat in the House of Commons from 1869 to 1874.

Family 
Hornby was the second son of the industrialist and politician William Henry Hornby and his wife Susannah née Birley. His brothers Albert and Cecil were both cricketers, and his brother William was a politician.

He was educated at Harrow and became a Justice of the Peace (JP) for Lancashire.

Career 
On 16 March 1869, the result of the 1868 general election in the borough of Blackburn was declared null and void, after an election petition had been lodged.
The two Conservatives who had been elected, Joseph Feilden and Edward Hornby's father William Henry Hornby, were unseated when Mr Justice Willes found that there had been widespread intimidation of voters. Edward Hornby was elected at the resulting by-election on 31 March 1869, along with Joseph Feilden's son Henry Master Feilden.

Both candidates had appealed for support as a tribute to their fathers, and Hornby had asserted that he had "no vain idea" that his own merits were enough to qualify him as an MP.

He held the seat until 1874, and did not contest the 1874 general election.

Cricket
Hornby was a brother of England cricket team captain A. N. Hornby and he played in one first-class match himself in 1862. He also played in Gentlemen of the North teams and at county level for Cheshire while playing at club level for Nantwich, and made a singe appearance for Shropshire, taking 8 wickets, in 1867.

Death
Hornby died at Nantwich, Cheshire, in June 1887 aged 48.

References

External links 
 
 

1839 births
1887 deaths
Conservative Party (UK) MPs for English constituencies
English cricketers
English cricketers of 1826 to 1863
Free Foresters cricketers
Gentlemen of the North cricketers
People educated at Harrow School
Politics of Blackburn with Darwen
UK MPs 1868–1874